Rictius Varus (Rictiovarus, Rixius Varus, Rexius Vicarius) was a Vicarius in Roman Gaul at the end of the 3rd century, around the time of the Diocletianic Persecution. The Roman Martyrology contains many references to the prefect Rixius Varus, who is said to have persecuted hundreds of Christians. In Christian hagiography he later repented and became a Christian martyr himself, and is regarded a Saint in the Eastern Orthodox and Roman Catholic Churches, with his feast day on July 6.

Modern scholars, however, question his existence and reject the story of his conversion.

Roman Prefect and Persecutor

He was appointed by the Emperor Maximian, and severely persecuted Christians. He is mentioned in Christian martyrologies with his name occurring in the stories of:

Valerius and Rufinus (287)
Saint Quentin (287)
Crispin and Crispinian (286)
Gentian, Fulcian and Victorice (287 or 303).
Donatian and Rogatian (c. 288–290).
 Martyrs Maxentius, Constantius, Crescentius, Justinus and their Companions, martyrs in Trier in Germany in the reign of Diocletian, under the governor Rictiovarus (c. 287)
 Palmatius and Companions, martyrs in Trier in Germany under Maximian (c. 287)
 Alexander of Trier, "the 12th bishop of Trier, was martyred by the Roman prefect Rictiovarus during the Diocletian persecution" (3rd century)

According to the Catholic Encyclopedia, he tried to kill himself in despair after failing to kill Crispin and Crispinian.

Christian Martyr

In Christian hagiography he repented and became a Christian martyr himself. The Roman Martyrology has his feast day on July 6, and states:

The same day, St. Lucia, martyr, a native of Campania. Being arrested and severely tortured by the lieutenant-governor Rictiovarus, she converted him to Christ. To them were added Antoninus, Severinus, Diodorus, Dion, and seventeen others, who shared their sufferings and their crowns.

Rexius also appears on July 6 in the calendar of the Eastern Orthodox Church, being martyred by beheading together with Virgin-martyr Lucy and several other martyrs, due to their courageous witness for Christ:

In German Legend 
A very different fate is attributed to "Rixius Varus" by the peasantry of the German Saarland. According to the art-historian and mythographer Karl Lohmeyer, it was believed that after his death the persecutor could not rest in his tomb, and haunts the Varuswald forest near the town of Tholey as a Wild Huntsman, flying through the air with a ghostly band and threatening punishment to transgressors.

Notes

References

3rd-century Christian martyrs
3rd-century Gallo-Roman people
Diocletianic Persecution